Manorville is a hamlet and census-designated place (CDP) in Suffolk County, New York, United States. The population was 14,314 at the 2010 census.

Manorville is mostly in the Town of Brookhaven, but its northeast corner is in the Town of Riverhead. Due to its  proximity to The Hamptons, Manorville is nicknamed "The Gateway to the Hamptons".

History
The hamlet of Manorville was a small farming community for many years. The area of the hamlet once laid within the huge tract of land known as Manor St. George, a land grant given to Col. William "Tangier" Smith in 1693 for recognition of his service as governor of Tangier in Morocco. In 1844, the Long Island Rail Road built a station called St. George's Manor, which was situated off of Ryerson Avenue. However, Seth Raynor, the station agent who was a patriot during the American Revolutionary War, disliked the name due to its similarity to the British and their colonial dominance (Saint George, the patron saint of England, is a symbol of the English monarchy), and decided to paint over the sign, leaving only the word "Manor". The hamlet changed its name to "Manorville" with the opening of its post office in 1907, but timetables and Long Island Rail Road documents retained the name "Manor" until 1907 or 1908.

Geography

The hamlet is at the western edge of, and partially within, the Long Island Central Pine Barrens. The land is heavily wooded, and features some wetlands, particularly in the northern section near the Peconic River.  Much of the northeastern portion of the hamlet is in the Pine Barrens' "Core Preservation Area", where no further development is allowed.  This area also serves as a primary source for Long Island's groundwater preserve.

Manorville is in the center of Long Island with no access to the water.  It lies partially on the Ronkonkoma terminal moraine, which creates some slightly rolling topography, especially in the central portion of the hamlet.  The glacial topography of the area features several kettle hole ponds, the most well-known of which is Punk's Hole, where a Revolutionary War captain was rumored to have hid from the British.

Demographics

Demographics of the CDP
As of the census of 2000, there were 11,131 people, 4,122 households, and 2,938 families residing in the CDP. The population density was 438.9 per square mile (169.5/km2). There were 4,243 housing units at an average density of 167.3/sq mi (64.6/km2). The racial makeup of the CDP was 96.38% White, 1.18% African American, 0.12% Native American, 0.66% Asian, 0.04% Pacific Islander, 0.75% from other races, and 0.89% from two or more races. Hispanic or Latino of any race were 4.14% of the population.

There were 4,122 households, out of which 36.4% had children under the age of 18 living with them, 63.4% were married couples living together, 5.9% had a female householder with no husband present, and 28.7% were non-families. 24.4% of all households were made up of individuals, and 9.6% had someone living alone who was 65 years of age or older. The average household size was 2.69 persons and the average family size was 3.25 persons.

In the hamlet, the population was spread out, with 27.6% under the age of 18, 5.2% from 18 to 24, 33.1% from 25 to 44, 20.9% from 45 to 64, and 13.2% who were 65 years of age or older and the median age was 37 years. For every 100 females, there were 98.4 males and for every 100 females age 18 and over, there were 94.7 males.

According to a 2018 estimate, the median income for a household was $95,851, and the median income for a family was $131,910. The per capita income for the CDP was $41,120. About 2.4% of families and 2.8% of the population were below the poverty threshold, including 2.3% of those under age 18 and 3.2% of those age 65 or over.

Education 
Manorville is served by the Eastport-South Manor Central School District.

Media
W245BA and WEHM are radio stations licensed to serve Manorville.

Notable people
Tom Clarke - had a  farm in 1906-07 before returning to Ireland
Seth Raynor - noted golf course architect

Attractions 
Built in 1975, the  Shrine of Our Lady of the Island overlooks Moriches Bay. On the 70 acres surrounding the statue, there are several attractions including a Rosary walk through the woods, the Stations of the Cross, and a large Pietà.

See also
Long Island Game Farm

References
 

Brookhaven, New York
Hamlets in New York (state)
Census-designated places in New York (state)
Riverhead (town), New York
Census-designated places in Suffolk County, New York
Hamlets in Suffolk County, New York